

Medalists

Qualification

Qualification rule: qualification standard 16.95m or at least best 8 qualified

Final

Triple jump at the World Athletics Indoor Championships
Triple Jump Men